The Greenville Commercial Historic District is a historic district located on two blocks of N. Main St. and E. Main Cross St. in Greenville, Kentucky. The district consists of thirteen commercial buildings, ten of which are contributing buildings. The buildings in the district are commercial buildings constructed in the late 19th and early 20th centuries. The oldest of the buildings are two Italianate buildings built in the 1870s. The district includes the First National Bank Building, a Beaux-Arts building constructed in 1901; a building at 121-123 N. Main with a metal facade and engaged columns; the Greenville Record building at 115 N. Main; Greenville's Odd Fellows hall at 103 E. Main Cross; and the Palace Theater at 121 N. Main.

The district was added to the National Register of Historic Places on August 15, 1985.

References

External links

Commercial buildings on the National Register of Historic Places in Kentucky
Italianate architecture in Kentucky
Beaux-Arts architecture in Kentucky
Historic districts on the National Register of Historic Places in Kentucky
National Register of Historic Places in Muhlenberg County, Kentucky
Greenville, Kentucky